Atelier is a residential condominium skyscraper located in Hudson Yards, Manhattan, New York. The skyscraper stands at 521 ft (158.8 m) and includes 478 individual units spanning 46 floors.

Building 
The Atelier skyscraper is located at 635 West 42nd Street in Manhattan, New York, which is operated by the Atelier President Daniel Neiditch. It is part of several high-rise buildings (along with Sky and Silver Towers) built in the Hudson Yards neighborhood of Manhattan that have transformed the area between 11th and 12th Avenue. At a height of 521 ft (158.8 m), Atelier looks over the Hudson River located a block away to the West. The skyscraper stands 46-stories tall and contains a total of 478 individual units. It is patrolled by the 10th Precinct of the New York City Police Department.

The skyscraper's name comes from the word for an artist's workshop. The skyscraper features an art gallery on the ground floor and often holds exhibitions of artwork. The gallery is also visible from the street and includes the lobby of the building as part of its exhibit space. As of January 2009, it featured the works of graphic designer and New York-based artist Milton Glaser.

In 2011, Daniel Neiditch, President of River 2 River Realty and the Atelier, had solar panels installed on the rooftop of the building. He says the system generates about 5 percent of the building’s energy, subsequently cutting utility costs by roughly $40,000 a year. As of 2013, Neiditch mentioned the solar panels were generating ten percent of the building's energy needs. In 2014, Atelier became one of the first buildings in New York to include an ice-skating rink on the roof of the building which was installed by Daniel Neiditch, president of the building who owns over 100 units in the building. The rooftop terrace is also the location of a private lounge open to residents of the building. As of 2014, the building also has several other amenities such as access to a playground, a basketball court, and a tennis court.

In 2016, Owner Daniel Neiditch promoted the most expensive planned condominium property in New York City. The penthouse property spanning the entire 45th floor of the building and including 10 bedrooms and 13 bathrooms was listed in 2016 at $85 million. It was to be created by combining nine units located on the top floor. The plan was to include a trip to outer space for two, and other such lavish amenities as a one-million-dollar yacht, two Rolls-Royce Phantoms, and a year's worth of "live-in butler services – as well as a private chef".

In 2018, Atelier started to allow 3 month minimum rentals for corporate housing.

History 
Atelier was designed by Costas Kondylis. Construction on the building began in 2004 and was completed in 2007. Atelier was part of the company's development project of Manhattan's West Side which included several buildings along 11th Avenue. River 2 River Realty led by Daniel Neiditch which handles the rentals and sales in the building has been a popular destination for celebrities including Deborah Cox, Brendan Fraser, Lindsay Lohan, Mekhi Phifer, and Dania Ramirez, some of whom have used it for brief stays in New York while performing on Broadway.

In popular culture 

As a prominent Hell's Kitchen building, Atelier, was featured prominently in the NETFLIX series Marvel's The Defenders. Nighttime scenes were filmed in the lobby and culminated with the depiction of the destruction of the building, known within the series as "Midland Circle", in the series finale.

References 

Condominiums and housing cooperatives in Manhattan
Residential buildings in Manhattan
Residential skyscrapers in Manhattan
Residential buildings completed in 2007
Hell's Kitchen, Manhattan
42nd Street (Manhattan)
Hudson Yards, Manhattan